Rex Pope is a British historian who was formerly head of the school of historical and critical studies at Lancashire Polytechnic. Pope is a specialist in the social and economic history of Britain in the later nineteenth and twentieth centuries. He has had two volumes published in the Seminar Studies in History series. Pope's other interests relate to the British hotel industry since 1850 and leisure hotels and tourism in the late nineteenth and early twentieth centuries.

Selected publications
Social Welfare in Britain 1885-1985. Routledge, 1986. (Editor with Alan Pratt and Bernard Hoyle) 
Atlas of British Social and Economic History since c. 1700. Routledge, 1989. 
War and Society in Britain 1899-1948. Longman, 1991. (Seminar Studies in History) 
University of Central Lancashire A History of the Development of the Institution since 1828. University of Central Lancashire, 1995. 
The British Economy since 1914: A Study in Decline? Longman, 1998. (Seminar Studies in History) 
Unemployment and the Lancashire Weaving Area, 1920-1938. University of Central Lancashire, 2000. (Harris Papers) 
"Unemployed Women in Inter-war Britain: the case of the Lancashire weaving district", Women's History Review, Volume 9, Number 4, 2000.
"A Consumer Service in Interwar Britain: The Hotel Trade, 1924–1938", Business History Review, Vol. 74, Issue 04, Winter 2000, pp 657–682.

References 

British historians
Academics of the University of Central Lancashire
Living people
Year of birth missing (living people)